Sir John Charles Fenton  (5 May 1880 – 3 January 1951) was a Scottish lawyer.

Biography 
Fenton was born 5 May 1880, the son of Elizabeth Jack and James Fenton of Edinburgh. He was educated at George Watson's College, at the University of Edinburgh and at the Sorbonne, in Paris.

He was admitted as a member of the Faculty of Advocates in 1904. After service in World War I, he was appointed a King's Counsel in 1923 and from February to November 1924 he was Solicitor General for Scotland in the first Labour Government in the UK. He was later Sheriff of Fife and Kinross from 1926 to 1937, of Stirling, Dumbarton, and Clackmannan from 1937 to 1942, and the Lothians and Peebles. and Sheriff of Chancery in Scotland from 1942.
    
He was knighted in 1945.

References

1880 births
1951 deaths
Knights Bachelor
Solicitors General for Scotland
People educated at George Watson's College
Alumni of the University of Edinburgh
University of Paris alumni
Members of the Faculty of Advocates
Scottish sheriffs
Scottish King's Counsel
20th-century King's Counsel
British expatriates in France